Mikhail Nikiforovich Katkov (13 February 1818 – 1 August 1887) was a conservative Russian journalist influential during the reign of tsar Alexander III.  He was a proponent of Russian nationalism, an important figure in the creation of a feeling of national identity and purpose. After the Crimean War (1856) and the Polish insurrection of 1863, Katkov abandoned his liberal Anglophile views and rejected the early reforms of tsar Alexander II. Instead he promoted a strong Russian state supported by an enthusiastic Russian people with a unified national outlook. His ideas were based on Western ideas (as opposed to Slavophile ideas). His literary magazine Russkii Vestnik ("The Russian Messenger") and newspaper Moskovskie Vedomosti ("Moscow News") were successful and influential media for promoting his views.

Life and work 
Katkov was born of a Russian government official and a Georgian noblewoman (Tulayeva). On finishing his course at the Moscow University, Katkov devoted himself to literature and philosophy. He showed so little individuality that during the reign of Nicholas I, he never came into disagreeable contact with the authorities. With the liberal reaction and strong reform movement that characterised the earlier years of Alexander II's reign (1855-1881) that he thoroughly sympathised, and for some time, he warmly advocated the introduction of liberal institutions of the British type, but when he perceived that the agitation was assuming a socialistic and nihilist tinge, and in some quarters of the liberal camp, indulgence was being shown to Polish national aspirations, he gradually modified his attitude until he came to be regarded by the Russian liberals as a renegade.

At the beginning of 1863, he assumed the management and editorship of the Moscow News, and he retained that position until his death in 1887. In the first year of his editorship, Moscow News had a circulation of 6000. By 1866, the circulation had risen to 12000. During the 24 years of editorship, he exercised considerable influence on public opinion and even on the government, by representing with great ability the moderately conservative spirit of Moscow in opposition to the occasionally ultraliberal and always cosmopolitan spirit of St Petersburg. With the Slavophiles, he agreed in advocating the extension of Russian influence in the Balkans, but he carefully kept aloof from them and condemned their sentimentality.

During the Trial of the 193, between 1877 and 1878, in which universities students were charged with treason for protesting in favor of a national constitution, Katkov sided with Konstantin Pobedonostsev in urging on Alexander III to heavier punishments and more a reactionary, conservative tone.

Though generally temperate in his views, he was extremely incisive and often violent in his modes of expressing them so he made many enemies and sometimes incurred the displeasure of the press censure and the ministers, against which he was more than once protected by Alexander III in consideration of his able advocacy of national interests. He is remembered chiefly as an energetic opponent of Polish national aspirations, of liberalism, of the system of public instruction based on natural science, and of German political influence. In the last capacity, he helped to prepare the way for the Franco-Russian Alliance. After Katkov's death, his place at the helm of the Conservatives was taken by Konstantin Pobedonostsev and Aleksey Suvorin.

References

Bibliography
 Fusso, S. (2016). Prelude to a Collaboration: Dostoevsky’s Aesthetic Polemic with Mikhail Katkov. In S. EVDOKIMOVA & V. GOLSTEIN (Eds.), Dostoevsky Beyond Dostoevsky: Science, Religion, Philosophy (pp. 193–212). Academic Studies Press. 
 Fusso, S. (2017). Editing Turgenev, Dostoevsky, and Tolstoy: Mikhail Katkov and the Great Russian Novel (NIU Series in Slavic, East European, and Eurasian Studies). DeKalb: Northern Illinois University Press.
 Morison, J. D. (1968). Katkov and Panslavism. The Slavonic and East European Review, 46(107), 422–441. 
 Pyziur, E. (1967). Mikhail N. Katkov: Advocate of English Liberalism in Russia, 1856-1863. The Slavonic and East European Review, 45(105), 439–456. 
 Renner, A. (2003). Defining a Russian Nation: Mikhail Katkov and the "Invention" of National Politics. The Slavonic and East European Review, 81(4), 659–682. 
 Vaysman, M. (2021). The Political Self-Conscious: The Russian Novel in the 1860s. In Self-Conscious Realism: Metafiction and the Nineteenth-Century Russian Novel (New edition, pp. 19–30). Modern Humanities Research Association.

Citations

 

1818 births
1887 deaths
Journalists from Moscow
People from Moskovsky Uyezd
Russian people of Georgian descent
Privy Councillor (Russian Empire)
Politicians of the Russian Empire
Journalists from the Russian Empire
Male writers from the Russian Empire
19th-century journalists
Russian male journalists
19th-century male writers from the Russian Empire
Russian duellists
Imperial Moscow University alumni
Recipients of the Order of St. Vladimir, 2nd class
Recipients of the Order of St. Anna, 1st class